Sitio De Calahonda is a small town in Andalusia, southern  Spain. It lies on the coast about halfway between Fuengirola and Marbella, and is part of the municipality of Mijas.

The town was developed by D. Juan de Orbaneja in 1963, occupying the space between Marbella and Mijas. It is maintained by its owners who manage an annual budget to deal with the maintenance of the common area (sidewalks, asphalt, street lighting, cleaning, cleaning of green areas, plan fire, etc.) by a board consisting of the presidents of various communities. It has more than 27 kilometres of roads, about 7,000 homes, 600,000 square meters of green areas. The predominant population is not of Spanish origin, being composed mainly expatriate Britons, Scandinavians, and Germans.

The town was affected by wildfires on September 11 and 12 of 2011, and again in September 2012.

Transport
There are various ways to get to Sitio De Calahonda, however public transport within the town is limited.

Bus
M-220 Bus - a bus that travels between nearby Fuengirola and Marbella, and comes every half an hour

Car
A-7 - the main coast road that is free for all drivers
AP-7 - the toll road that runs above Sitio De Calahonda in the mountains

Train
There are currently no links to Sitio De Calahonda by train, however talks are underway to extend Fuengirola's Cercanías Málaga line to Marbella.

Sport
La Siesta Golf Club - a course designed by Enrique Canales which consists of nine holes
Club Del Sol Tennis Club - offers tennis, squash, gym and paddle facilities

References

External links

andalucia.com/marbella/calahonda.htm

Populated places in Andalusia